Ochodza may refer to the following places:
Ochodza, Gniezno County in Greater Poland Voivodeship (west-central Poland)
Ochodza, Wągrowiec County in Greater Poland Voivodeship (west-central Poland)
Ochodza, Lesser Poland Voivodeship (south Poland)
Ochodza, Pomeranian Voivodeship (north Poland)